The Ecclesiastical Province of Rupert's Land, founded in 1875, forms one of four ecclesiastical provinces in the Anglican Church of Canada.

Territorial evolution 

The territory covered by the province is roughly coterminous with the western portion of the former Hudson's Bay Company concession of Rupert's Land, as well as the North-Western Territory of British North America.  It today consists of the present day provinces of Alberta, Saskatchewan, and Manitoba, as well as the extreme western portion of Ontario and the Nunavik area of Quebec.  It also includes all of the territories of Nunavut and the Northwest Territories.

At almost 6.5 million square kilometres, it is the largest ecclesiastical province by area in the country, and was even larger when it was created. The Anglican Diocese of Moosonee was joined to the Ecclesiastical Province of Ontario in 1912. The five dioceses in British Columbia were also originally part of Rupert's Land Ecclesiastical Province, until they became an Ecclesiastical Province of their own in 1914. Furthermore, the Diocese of Selkirk was part of Rupert's Land until it joined the British Columbia province in 1943, as the Anglican Diocese of Yukon.

Dioceses 

There are presently 10 dioceses in the province:

 Athabasca (Alberta)
 Arctic (Northwest Territories, Nunavut, and Nunavik (northern Quebec))
 Brandon (Manitoba)
 Calgary (Alberta)
 Edmonton (Alberta)
 Mishamikoweesh (northern Manitoba and northwestern Ontario)
 Qu'Appelle (Saskatchewan)
 Rupert's Land (Manitoba)
 Saskatchewan (Saskatchewan)
 Saskatoon (Saskatchewan)

Metropolitan
The provinces of the Anglican Church of Canada are headed by metropolitan bishops, elected from among the provinces' diocesan bishops, who then become archbishops of their own diocese and the metropolitan of their province.

The current metropolitan of the Province of Rupert's Land is Greg Kerr-Wilson who is the Archbishop of Calgary.

Metropolitans of Rupert's Land
Source:

See also
Ecclesiastical provinces of the Anglican Church of Canada
List of dioceses of the Anglican Church of Canada

References

External links
Provincial website

 
Rupert's Land
Rupert's Land, Ecclesiastical Province of
Religious organizations established in 1875
1875 establishments in Canada
Ecclesiastical provinces of the Anglican Church of Canada